Khurshid Azam (born June 16, 1942) is a Pakistani field hockey player. He competed in the 1964 Summer Olympics, where he was a member of the silver medal winning team.

References

External links
 

Field hockey players at the 1964 Summer Olympics
Pakistani male field hockey players
Olympic field hockey players of Pakistan
Olympic silver medalists for Pakistan
Olympic medalists in field hockey
Medalists at the 1964 Summer Olympics
1942 births
Living people
20th-century Pakistani people